The Bendegó Meteorite (also known as Pedra do Bendegó or simply Bendengó) is a meteorite found in the interior of the state of Bahia, Brazil. It is the biggest iron meteorite ever found in Brazilian soil, weighting . It has been on display at the National Museum of Brazil, in Rio de Janeiro, since 1888.

It survived the fire that destroyed the museum in 2018, sustaining no major damage.

Discovery 

The Bendegó meteorite was found in 1784 by the boy Domingos da Motta Botelho, who grazed cattle on a farm near the present town of Monte Santo, Bahia. At the time of its finding, it was the second largest meteorite in the world. Judging from the four-inch layer of oxidation upon which it rested, and the lost part of its lower portion, it is estimated that it had been in place for thousands of years.

Transport to Museum 
News of the finding quickly spread. In 1785, governor D. Rodrigues Menezes arranged for it to be transported to Salvador, however, the meteorite's excessive weight made transportation difficult. The cart it was on ran out of control down a hill and the meteorite fell into a dry stream bed, 180 meters away from the spot where it was originally found. It remained there until 1888, when it was recovered and brought to the National Museum.

Description and composition 
The meteorite is an irregular mass,  reminding, in appearance, an asteroid. It has numerous depressions on the surface and cylindrical holes oriented parallel to its greater length. These holes were formed by the burning of the troilite, during the transatmospheric passage of the meteorite, since the sulfide has a lower melting point than the rest of the meteorite, consuming more quickly. It is a metallic meteorite, consisting basically of iron, with the following elements: 6.6% Ni, 0.47% Co, 0.22% P, and traces of S and C in much smaller quantities, only measured in parts by million.

See also 

 Collection of meteorites in the National Museum of Brazil
 Glossary of meteoritics
 List of largest meteorites on Earth
 Bendegó meteorite (report)

External links 
  Os 10 maiores meteoritos encontrados no Brasil 
 Bendego Meteorite

References 

Meteorites found in Brazil
National Museum of Brazil
1784 archaeological discoveries